'Tere Bin' is an Urdu/Hindi phrase meaning 'Without You'.

Tere Bin may also refer to:

 Tere Bin (Atif Aslam song), a song from the 2006 movie Bas Ek Pal and sung by Atif Aslam
 Tere Bin (Rabbi Shergill song), a love song by Rabbi Shergill, from his first album Rabbi released in 2004
 "Tere Bin Nahin Lagda", a Qawwali song by Nusrat Fateh Ali Khan
 "Tere Bin", a cover version of the song in the 2018 film Simmba
 Tere Bin (TV series), a 2016 Indian television series
 Tere Bin (Pakistani TV series), a 2022 Pakistani television series

Hindi words and phrases